Avondale High School may refer to:

In the United Kingdom 
 Avondale High School (Cheadle Heath) in Stockport, England

In the United States 
 Avondale High School (DeKalb County, Georgia) in DeKalb County, Georgia
 Avondale High School (Michigan), Auburn Hills, Michigan

See also 
 Avondale School (Wiltshire) in Wiltshire, England.
 Avondale School (Cooranbong) in New South Wales, Australia.